Chinthagumpala is a village in Chinaganjam mandal, Bapatla District, Andhra Pradesh, India. The village has a population of 1443.

References

Villages in Prakasam district